Captain Walker may refer to :

 Captain Frederic John Walker (1896–1944), a Royal Navy officer during World War II
 Captain Walker, a character in The Who's Tommy
 Captain Walker, a character in Mad Max Beyond Thunderdome
 Captain Martin Walker, main character of Spec Ops: The Line 
 John Walker (Marvel Cinematic Universe), a character in the Marvel Cinematic Universe

See also
 Joseph R. Walker (1798—1876), an American mountain man and scout